Kaaren Ragland is the founder of The Sounds of The Supremes.

Biography
Kaaren Ragland was born in Richmond, Virginia.  She attended the Northfield School in Massachusetts, Brown University (BA) and studied acting at Boston University’s School of Fine Arts (MFA) where she also took classes in the Music Department.  Ragland's later education included a JD from UCLA. She states that her mother, a well known Virginia educator, always stressed the importance of a well-rounded education.

Career
Ragland appeared in the Broadway theatre production of "Eubie" with Cab Calloway, and in productions of “Little Shop of Horrors” and "Balm in Gilead" in Los Angeles.  She was the first African-American ingenue hired by the National Shakespeare Company in New York City in the mid 70’s while she was still a student at Boston University. In addition Kaaren Ragland appeared in several productions of the play “For Colored Girls Who Have Considered Suicide/When The Rainbow is Enuf” in Los Angeles at the Mark Taper Forum, the Huntington Hartford, and at the Buffalo Studio Arena Theatre. In addition she appeared in more than 20 National Television Spot Commercials.

In 1977, last original and founding member Mary Wilson decided to disband the Supremes and forge a solo career. Wilson hired Ragland for concert tours in the United Kingdom, Europe, South East Asia and Australia during 1978, continuing throughout the 80's as a background singer for Wilson. Mary continued to tour with Ragland and others performing in the US, Canada, South America, Japan and Europe. Ragland 's final tour with Wilson took place in March and April 1989.

In late 1989, Ragland formed a group called “The Sounds of the Supremes” with whom she has appeared in over 70 countries around the world. Wilson attempted to prevent her using the name "The Sounds of the Supremes” in a Federal Court action in 1996. But, based on extensive contractual evidence and her multiple concert performance history that began in the UK in 1978 (while contracted to perform as a member of “The Supremes”) the court found in Ragland’s favor, granting her the right to use her own name: “The Sounds of the Supremes".

'Sounds of the Supremes' Personnel
 Kaaren Ragland, Althea Burkhalter, Angel Rose 
 Former members: Roberta Freeman, Van Jewel, Wendy Smith, Hollis Payseur, Kathy Merrick

Albums
Live At The Highclere Castle (2007)
1.  Symphony
2.  You Keep Me Hanging On
3.  Where Did Our Love Go
4.  Love Child
5.  Love Is Here And Now You're Gone
6.  Reflections
7.  Stoned Love
8.  You Can't Hurry Love
9.  Come See About Me
10. Back In My Arms Again
11. Baby Love
12. Love Is Like An Itching In My Heart
13. Stop In The Name Of Love
14. Someday We'll Be Together
15. I Hear A Symphony
16. Symphony Reprise

External links
The Sounds of the Supremes Group Site
 https://archive.today/20140615211724/http://www.tsdmemphis.com/index.php/entertainment/1202-

References 

American women singers
Living people
Boston University College of Fine Arts alumni
Year of birth missing (living people)
21st-century American women